Saraavesi is a medium-sized lake in Laukaa, Finland. It flows to lake Leppävesi via Kuhankoski rapids. The lake is part of Keitele Canal, a waterway connecting Lake Keitele and Päijänne. Saraakallio rock paintings are located on the shore of Saraavesi.

Several parts of the lake are included to the Natura 2000 protection program. There are a shallow lake Peukaloinen, Saraakallio rocks, eskers, Tarvaalanvirta and Kuusaankoski rapids and some cultural heritage places.

See also
List of lakes in Finland

References

External links 
 

Kymi basin
Landforms of Central Finland
Lakes of Laukaa